Annie Gam-Pedersen  (born 5 July 1965) is a Danish footballer who played as a forward for the Denmark women's national football team. She was part of the team at the 1984 European Competition for Women's Football, 1991 FIFA Women's World Cup and UEFA Women's Euro 1993. At the club level, she played for Odense BK in Denmark.

References

External links
 

1965 births
Living people
Danish women's footballers
Denmark women's international footballers
Place of birth missing (living people)
1991 FIFA Women's World Cup players
Women's association football forwards